Batrachedra aphypnota is a moth of the family Batrachedridae. It is found in Sri Lanka (western region, Puttalam).

References

Batrachedridae
Moths described in 1917